IAEC may refer to:

Inter-American Economic Council
International Association of Elevator Consultants
International Association of Evangelical Chaplains
Israel Atomic Energy Commission